The 2010 Karjala Tournament is an ice hockey tournament that took place between November 11 and November 14, 2010. Five matches were played in Hartwall Areena in Helsinki, Finland and one match was played in Budvar Arena in České Budějovice, Czech Republic. The tournament was a part of the Euro Hockey Tour.

Standings

Results
All times local

Scoring leaders
GP = Games played; G = Goals; A = Assists; Pts = Points; +/− = Plus/minus; PIM = Penalties in minutes; POS = PositionSource: Swehockey

Goaltending leaders
TOI = Time on ice (minutes:seconds); SA = Shots against; GA = Goals against; GAA = Goals against average; Sv% = Save percentage; SO = ShutoutsSource: Swehockey>

Tournament awards
Best players selected by the directorate:
Best Goaltender:  Vasiliy Koshechkin
Best Defenceman:  Mattias Ekholm
Best Forward:  Petri Kontiola
Media All-Star Team:
Goaltender:  Vasiliy Koshechkin
Defence:  Jyrki Välivaara,  Magnus Johansson
Forwards:  Janne Lahti,  Niko Kapanen,  Robert Nilsson

See also
Karjala Tournament

References

2010–11 Euro Hockey Tour
2010–11 in Swedish ice hockey
2010–11 in Russian ice hockey
2010–11 in Finnish ice hockey
2010–11 in Czech ice hockey
Karjala Tournament
2010
November 2010 sports events in Europe
2010s in Helsinki
Sport in České Budějovice